Maria Tesselschade Roemers Visscher, also called  Maria Tesselschade Roemersdochter Visscher or Tesselschade (25 March 1594 – 20 June 1649) was a Dutch poet and glass engraver.

Life
Tesselschade was born in Amsterdam, the youngest of three daughters of poet and humanist Roemer Visscher. She was given the name Tesselschade ("Damage on Tessel"), because her father lost ships near the Dutch island Texel on Christmas Eve 1593, three months before her birth, to remember that 'worldly wealth could be gone instantly.'

She and her sister Anna Visscher were the only female members of the Muiderkring, the group of Dutch Golden Age intellectuals who met at Muiden Castle. She is often characterised as a muse of the group and attracted the admiration of its members, such as its organiser Hooft, Huygens, Barlaeus, Bredero, Heinsius, Vondel and Jacob Cats.

In their correspondence, she is described as attractive, musically talented, and a skilled translator and commentator from French and Italian. They also praised her skill at singing, painting, carving, glass engraving and tapestry work.  The Rijksmuseum Amsterdam has an example of her engraving work, a römer drinking glass engraved with the motto Sic Soleo Amicos ("this is how I treat my friends").

In 1623, she married a ship's officer, Allard Crombalch. After he died in 1634, Huygens and Barlaeus proposed marriage to her, offers she rejected.

In remembrance of Tesselschade there are several streets named after her, such as Tesselschadestraat and Tesselschadelaan in 
Alkmaar, Eindhoven, Amsterdam, Zwolle, Leiden and Leeuwarden.

References

Further reading
Lennep, J, Herman F. C. Kate, and W P. Hoevenaar. Galerij Van Beroemde Nederlanders Uit Het Tijdvak Van Frederik Hendrik. Utrecht: L.E. Bosch en Zoon, 1868.

External links

Maria Tesselschade Visscher - digital version of all her poems 
Visscher, Tesselschade Roemersdr., Digitaal Vrouwenlexicon van Nederland (in Dutch)

1594 births
1649 deaths
17th-century Dutch poets
17th-century Dutch women writers
17th-century writers
Dutch women poets
Engravers from Amsterdam
Muiderkring
Writers from Amsterdam
Dutch Golden Age writers
Burials at the Oude Kerk, Amsterdam
Dutch women artists
Glass engravers
Women engravers
17th-century engravers
17th-century women artists
Italian–Dutch translators
Dutch glass artists